Arctic Watch Lodge Aerodrome  is a registered aerodrome airport located in the north of Somerset Island, Nunavut, Canada.

References

Airports in the Arctic
Certified airports in the Qikiqtaaluk Region